92 (ninety-two) is the natural number following 91 and preceding 93.

In mathematics
92 is the eighth pentagonal number, and an Erdős–Woods number, since it is possible to find sequences of 92 consecutive integers such that each inner member shares a factor with either the first or the last member. 

For , there are 92 solutions in the n-Queens Problem.

There are 92 "atomic elements" in John Conway's look-and-say sequence, corresponding to the 92 non-transuranic elements in the chemist's periodic table.

92 is palindromic in bases 6 (2326), 7 (1617), 22 (4422), and  45 (2245).

The most faces or vertices an Archimedean or Catalan solid can have is 92: the snub dodecahedron has 92 faces while its dual polyhedron, the pentagonal hexecontahedron, has 92 vertices. 

As a simple polyhedron, the final stellation of the icosahedron has 92 vertices.

There are 92 Johnson solids.

In science
The atomic number of uranium, an actinide.
 Messier object M92, a magnitude 7.5 globular cluster in the constellation Hercules
 The New General Catalogue object NGC 92, a magnitude 13.1 peculiar spiral galaxy in the constellation Phoenix, and a member of Robert's Quartet

In other fields 
Ninety-two is also:

 The code for international direct dial phone calls to Pakistan.
 The numeric code for the Hauts-de-Seine department of France. The number is reflected in the department's postal code, plus the names of at least three local sports clubs, specifically Racing 92 in rugby union and Metropolitans 92 and Nanterre 92 in basketball.
 In the title of the book Ninety-two in the Shade, by Thomas McGuane.
 The 92nd Tiger book by Michael Gilbert.
 The House on 92nd Street, a 1945 film.
 The model number of the gray Texas Instruments TI-92 graphing calculator.
 The Beretta 92 series of semi-automatic pistols.
 The "Illustrious 92" or "Glorious 92": Massachusetts legislators who refused to rescind the Massachusetts Circular Letter soliciting other British colonies' support in resistance to the Townshend Acts prior to the American Revolution. Analogous to the number 45 in reference to the protests of John Wilkes against British corruption.
 The ISBN Group Identifier for books published by international publishers such as UNESCO.
 The number which runs through almost every single of British film-maker Peter Greenaway's films. This number has special association with the fictional character of Greenaway's creation, Tulse Luper. It is said the number itself is based on a mathematical error in calculations concerning John Cage's work Indeterminacy. See The Falls for extensive use of this number.
"92", a song by Avail from their 1996 album 4am Friday.
 STS-92 Space Shuttle Discovery mission, on October 11, 2000, to the International Space Station.
 According to Guinness World Records, Taumatawhakatangihangakoauauotamatea­urehaeaturipukakapiki­maungahoro­nukupokaiwhenuakitanatahu is the longer version of the longest place name in the world, with 92 letters.
 The 92nd Street Y in Manhattan.

Vehicles
 The Saab 92 automobile
 The  gunboat

In sports
 The 92 Club is a society of association football fans who have attended a home match of all 92 current member clubs of the Premier League and English Football League in England and Wales.

See also
 List of highways numbered 92

References 

Integers